Virginia Ruano Pascual and Paola Suárez were the defending champions, but lost in semifinals to Nadia Petrova and Meghann Shaughnessy. The latter pair eventually won the title, by defeating Janette Husárová and Conchita Martínez 6–2, 2–6, 6–1 in the final.

It was the 7th doubles title for both Petrova and Shaughnessy in their respective careers. It was also the 3rd title for the pair during this season, after their wins in Miami and Amelia Island.

Seeds
The first four seeds received a bye into the second round.

Draw

Finals

Top half

Bottom half

References
 Main and Qualifying Draws

Ladies German Open - Doubles
WTA German Open